Mount Vernon is an unincorporated community in Kingman County, Kansas, United States.  It is located near the southwest side of the Cheney Reservoir dam.

Education
The community is served by Cheney USD 268 public school district.

References

External links
 Kingman County maps: Current, Historic, KDOT

Unincorporated communities in Kingman County, Kansas
Unincorporated communities in Kansas